Hibbertia praemorsa is a species of flowering plant in the family Dilleniaceae and is endemic to southern New South Wales. It is a shrub with hairy foliage, oblong leaves and yellow flowers arranged singly on the ends of branches with seven to nine stamens on one side of two carpels.

Description
The flowers are arranged singly on the ends of branches with leaf-like bracts at the base. Flowering mainly occurs from October to February.

Taxonomy
Hibbertia patens was first formally described in 2010 by Hellmut R. Toelken in the Journal of the Adelaide Botanic Gardens from specimens collected in Morton National Park in 1999. The specific epithet (praemorsa) means "bitten off", referring to the truncated ends of the leaves.

Distribution and habitat
This hibbertia grows on steep, rocky slopes in Morton National Park, the Budawang Range and Bundanoon.

See also
List of Hibbertia species

References

praemorsa
Flora of New South Wales
Plants described in 2010
Taxa named by Hellmut R. Toelken